This article refers to sports broadcasting contracts in Albania. For a list of broadcasting rights in other countries, see Sports television broadcast contracts.

Football

National teams 

 2022 FIFA World Cup: RTSH
 UEFA Nations League
SuperSport (2018/2027)
Klan TV (only Albania NT matches)
2022 FIFA World Cup qualification (UEFA)
DigitAlb
RTSH (only Albania NT matches)
 2022 FIFA World Cup qualification (CONMEBOL): RTSH
2021 FIFA Futsal World Cup: RTSH
2022 UEFA EURO U-19: RTSH
2022 UEFA Under-19 Futsal Championship: RTSH
2022 FIFA U-17 Women's World Cup: RTSH
2023 FIFA Women's World Cup qualification: RTSH (Only Albania WNT matches)
UEFA Women's Euro 2022: RTSH
2023 UEFA Women's Under-19 Championship qualification: RTSH (Only Albania WNT matches)
2022 FIFA U-20 Women's World Cup: RTSH 
 UEFA Euro 2024: TBA
UEFA Euro 2024 qualifying
SuperSport
Klan TV (only Albania NT matches)
UEFA Euro 2028 qualifying: SuperSport
2026 FIFA World Cup qualification
SuperSport
Klan TV (only Albania NT matches) 
 2023 FIFA Women's World Cup: RTSH
 2023 FIFA U-20 World Cup: RTSH

Football Leagues

UEFA Champions League
Tring Sport (2015/2024)
RTSH (2021/2024) (only one Wednesday match + Final)
UEFA Europa League: SuperSport (2018/2024)
UEFA Conference League: SuperSport (2021/2024)
UEFA Youth League
Tring Sport (2018/2024)
RTSH (Only clubs from Albania)
Premier League: SuperSport (2016/2025)
La Liga: SuperSport (2021/2026)
La Liga 2: SuperSport (2021/2026)
Serie A
Oversport (2021/2024)
Tring Sport (2021/2024) (in collaboration with Oversport)
Bundesliga: SuperSport (2021/2025)
Bundesliga 2: SuperSport (2021/2025)
Ligue 1: SuperSport (2015/2024)
Ligue 2: SuperSport (2022/2024)
Eredivise: SuperSport (2016/2025)
Kategoria Superiore
Oversport (2022/2025)
RTSH (Only one game for matchweek) (2022/2025)
Kategoria e Parë
Oversport (2022/2025)
RTSH (Only one game for matchweek) (2022/2025)
Süper Lig: Tring Sport (2018/2024)
Scottish Premiership: Oversport (2022/2025)
Primeira Liga: Tring Sport (2018/2023)

Cups

UEFA Super Cup
Tring Sport (2015-2023)
RTSH (2021-2023)
FIFA Club World Cup: NO BROADCASTER YET (2023-2024)
Copa del Rey: Oversport (2022/2025)
Supercopa de España: SuperSport (2019/2025)
Coupe de France: SuperSport (2018/2026)
Trophée des Champions: SuperSport (2021-2024)
Kupa e Shqipërisë: Oversport (2022/2025)
Superkupa e Shqipërisë: Oversport (2022-2025)
The FA Cup: SuperSport (2015/2024)
EFL Cup: : SuperSport (2022/2024)
Coppa Italia: SuperSport (2015/2024)
Supercoppa Italiana: SuperSport (2022-2024)
DFB Pokal: SuperSport (2022/2025)
DFL-Supercup: SuperSport (2021-2025)
Scottish League Cup: Oversport (2022/2025)

Sport Channels

part of TiBO & Oversport

Oversport News (FHD 1080i)
Oversport 1 (FHD 1080i)
Oversport 2 (FHD 1080i)
Oversport 3 (FHD 1080i)
Oversport 4 (FHD 1080i)
Oversport 5 (FHD 1080i)
Sport ALB (FHD 1080i)
Partizani Channel (FHD 1080i)
ISP Sport (FHD 1080i)
Tring Sport News HD (FHD 1080i)
Tring Sport 1 (FHD 1080i)
Tring Sport 2 (FHD 1080i)
Tring Sport 3 (FHD 1080i)
Tring Sport 4 (FHD 1080i)
Tring Sport 5 (FHD 1080i)
RTSH Sport (FHD 1080i)
Sportitalia ( SD & HD )
Eurosport 1 (FHD 1080i)
Eurosport 2 (FHD 1080i)
TRT Spor
A Spor
FightBox (SD)

part of Tring
Tring Sport News HD (FHD 1080i)
Tring Sport 1 (FHD 1080i)
Tring Sport 2 (FHD 1080i)
Tring Sport 3 (FHD 1080i)
Tring Sport 4 (FHD 1080i)
Tring Sport 5 (FHD 1080i)
RTSH Sport (HD 720p)

part of RTSH
 RTSH Sport (FHD 1080i)

part of DigitAlb
SuperSport 1 (FHD 1080i)
SuperSport 2 (FHD 1080i)
SuperSport 3 (FHD 1080i)
SuperSport 4 (FHD 1080i)
SuperSport 5 (FHD 1080i)
SuperSport 6 (FHD 1080i)
SuperSport 7 (FHD 1080i)
Eurosport 1 (FHD 1080i)
Eurosport 2 (FHD 1080i)
RTSH Sport (SD)
Gametoon (SD)
FightBox (SD)
Fast&Fun Box (FHD 1080i)

Basketball

NBA: Tring Sport (2020/2025)
Albanian Basketball Superleague: RTSH
Liga Unike: RTSH

Volleyball

CEV EuroVolley 2021: Oversport
CEV EUROVOLLEY 2023 qualification
Oversport
RTSH

Tennis
Australian Open: Eurosport
Wimbledon: SuperSport (2022-2025) (Only on EN lang.)
US Open: Eurosport
Laver Cup: Eurosport
Davis Cup: Eurosport
Adelaide International: Eurosport
Roland Garros: Eurosport
ATP Finals: SuperSport
ATP 1000: SuperSport
ATP 500: SuperSport

Motosports
Formula E: Eurosport
Formula One: RTSH (2018-2023)
Moto GP: Tring Sport (2023/2024/2025)
Moto2: Tring Sport (2023/2024/2025)
Moto3: Tring Sport (2023/2024/2025)
Porsche Supercup: Eurosport
Pure ETCR: Eurosport
European Rally Championship: Eurosport
FIA WTCC: Eurosport
FIA World Endurance Championship: Eurosport
24 Hours of Le Mans: Eurosport
FIM EWC: Eurosport
FIM Speedway Grand Prix: Eurosport

Golf
PGA Tour: Eurosport

Cycling
Vuelta a España:  Eurosport
Tour de France: Eurosport
Giro d'Italia:  Eurosport
Tour of Britain: Eurosport
La Doyenne: Eurosport
Amstel Gold Race: Eurosport
Milan–San Remo: Eurosport
Giro di Lombardia: Eurosport
Paris–Roubaix: Eurosport
Tour of Denmark: Eurosport
Clásica de San Sebastián: Eurosport
Critérium du Dauphiné: Eurosport
La Flèche Wallonne: Eurosport
Tour of the Basque: Eurosport
Tour of Flanders: Eurosport
Tirreno–Adriatico: Eurosport
Deutschland Tour: Eurosport
 Tour of Slovakia: Eurosport
Primus Classic: Eurosport
Giro di Sicilia: Eurosport
Eschborn–Frankfurt: Eurosport
Tour of Croatia: Eurosport
Tour of Turkey: Eurosport
Tour de Romandie: Eurosport
Four Days of Dunkirk: Eurosport
Critérium du Dauphiné: Eurosport
Brussels Cycling Classic: Eurosport
Tour of Norway: Eurosport
UCI Mountain Bike World Cup
RTSH
Eurosport

Combat sports 
Dream Boxing: DAZN: October 2022 to October 2025, all fights
Bushido MMA: DAZN: October 2022 to October 2025, all fights
 King of Kings: FightBox and DAZN (October 2022 to October 2025)
 UFC : SuperSport (2020-2023)
 WWE : RTSH (2017-2019)

eSports 

 eSerie A: Oversport

Athletics 
IAAF Diamond League: SuperSport
World Athletics Continental Tour: Oversport (2021-2024)
World Athletics Indoor Tour: Oversport (2021-2024)

Olympic Games
2020 Summer Olympics:
RTSH
Eurosport
2022 Winter Olympics: Eurosport

Squash 
PSA World Tour (2021-2024)
WSF World Tour (2021-2024)

See also 

 Television in Albania
 Vizion Plus
 Tring 
 Tring Sport
 RTSH
 DigitAlb
 SuperSport

References

Albania
Television in Albania